In numerical analysis, the order of convergence and the rate of convergence of a convergent sequence are quantities that represent how quickly the sequence approaches its limit.

The rate of convergence  is also called the asymptotic error constant.
Note that this terminology is not standardized and some authors will use rate where
this article uses order (e.g.).

In practice, the rate and order of convergence provide useful insights when using iterative methods for calculating numerical approximations. If the order of convergence is higher, then typically fewer iterations are necessary to yield a useful approximation. Strictly speaking, however, the asymptotic behavior of a sequence does not give conclusive information about any finite part of the sequence.

Similar concepts are used for discretization methods. The solution of the discretized problem converges to the solution of the continuous problem as the grid size goes to zero, and the speed of convergence is one of the factors of the efficiency of the method. However, the terminology, in this case, is different from the terminology for iterative methods.

Series acceleration is a collection of techniques for improving the rate of convergence of a series discretization. Such acceleration is commonly accomplished with sequence transformations.

Convergence speed for iterative methods

Convergence definitions 
Suppose that the sequence  converges to the number . It is not necessary, however, that  be an integer. For example, the secant method, when converging to a regular, simple root, has an order of φ ≈ 1.618.

Convergence with order
  is called quadratic convergence.
  is called cubic convergence.
 etc.

Order estimation 
A practical method to calculate the order of convergence for a sequence is to calculate the following sequence, which converges to :

Q-convergence definitions 
In addition to the previously defined Q-linear convergence, a few other Q-convergence definitions exist. The sequence  converges logarithmically to  if the sequence converges sublinearly and additionally if
.
Note that unlike previous definitions,  logarithmic convergence is not called "Q-logarithmic."

In the definitions above, the "Q-" stands for "quotient" because the terms are defined using the quotient between two successive terms. Often, however, the "Q-" is dropped and a sequence is simply said to have linear convergence, quadratic convergence, etc.

R-convergence definition 
Therefore, the definition of rate of convergence is extended as follows.

The sequence is said to converge R-linearly to  if there exists a sequence  such that

and  converges Q-linearly to zero. The "R-" prefix stands for "root".

Examples
Consider the sequence

To determine the type of convergence, we plug the sequence into the definition of Q-linear convergence,

More generally, for any , the sequence  converges linearly with rate .

The sequence 
 
also converges linearly to 0 with rate 1/2 under the R-convergence definition, but not under the Q-convergence definition.

The sequence 

converges superlinearly. In fact, it is quadratically convergent.

Finally, the sequence 

converges sublinearly and logarithmically.

Convergence speed for discretization methods

A similar situation exists for discretization methods designed to approximate a function , which might be an integral being approximated by numerical quadrature, or the solution of an ordinary differential equation (see example below). The discretization method generates a sequence , where each successive  is a function of  along with the grid spacing  between successive values of the independent variable .

In this case, the sequence  is said to converge to the sequence  with order q if there exists a constant C such that

This is written as  using big O notation.

This is the relevant definition when discussing methods for numerical quadrature or the solution of ordinary differential equations (ODEs).

The order of convergence is then approximated by the following formula:

which comes from writing the truncation error, at the old and new grid spacings, as

The error  is, more specifically, a global truncation error (GTE), in that it represents a sum of errors accumulated over all  iterations, as opposed to a local truncation error  (LTE) over just one iteration.

Example of discretization methods 
Consider the ordinary differential equation

with initial condition .  We can solve this equation using the Forward Euler scheme for numerical discretization:

which generates the sequence

In this case, the truncation error is

Examples (continued)
This sequence converges with order 1 according to the convention for discretization methods.

It is said to converge exponentially using the convention for discretization methods. However, it only converges linearly (that is, with order 1) using the convention for iterative methods.

Recurrent sequences and fixed points
The case of recurrent sequences  which occurs in dynamical systems and in the context of various fixed-point theorems is of particular interest. Assuming that the relevant derivatives of f are continuous, one can (easily) show that for a fixed point  such that , one has at least linear convergence for any starting value  sufficiently close to p. If , then one has a repulsive fixed point and no starting value will produce a sequence converging to p (unless one directly jumps to the point p itself).

Acceleration of convergence
Many methods exist to increase the rate of convergence of a given sequence, 
i.e. to transform a given sequence into one converging faster to the same limit.  Such techniques are in general known as "series acceleration". The goal of the transformed sequence is to reduce the computational cost of the calculation. One example of series acceleration is Aitken's delta-squared process. These methods in general (and in particular Aitken's method) do not increase the order of convergence, and are useful only if initially the convergence is not faster than linear: If  convergences linearly, one gets a sequence  that still converges linearly (except for pathologically designed special cases), but faster in the sense that . On the other hand, if the convergence is already of order ≥ 2, Aitken's method will bring no improvement.

References

Literature
The simple definition is used in
 Michelle Schatzman (2002), Numerical analysis: a mathematical introduction, Clarendon Press, Oxford. .

The extended definition is used in
 Walter Gautschi (1997), Numerical analysis: an introduction, Birkhäuser, Boston. .
 Endre Süli and David Mayers (2003), An introduction to numerical analysis, Cambridge University Press. .

The Big O definition is used in
Richard L. Burden and J. Douglas Faires (2001), Numerical Analysis (7th ed.), Brooks/Cole. 

The terms Q-linear and R-linear are used in; The Big O definition when using Taylor series is used in
 .

Numerical analysis
Convergence